The fifth season of the television comedy series Arrested Development premiered on Netflix on May 29, 2018. The season consists of 16 episodes, split into two eight-episode parts; with the second half released on March 15, 2019. This is the second revival season after the series was canceled by Fox in 2006; the fourth season premiered in 2013.

The show's storyline centers on the Bluth family, a formerly wealthy, habitually dysfunctional family, and the show incorporates hand-held camera work, narration, archival photos and historical footage.

One central storyline of season five is a "whodunit" regarding the mysterious disappearance of Lucille Austero in the very midst of her congressional campaign. The season also features the cast together more frequently, as season four primarily had the cast separated due to scheduling difficulties.

Development and production
On July 12, 2013, Netflix was in discussions for a fifth season. In August 2014, Netflix chief content officer Ted Sarandos stated in an interview with USA Today that there is a strong possibility of a fifth season. "It's just a matter of when." In April 2015, executive producer Brian Grazer confirmed that a fifth season was in development and would consist of 17 episodes. Jason Bateman contradicted this in February 2016, however, and said regarding a fifth season, "There is no plan. I haven't heard of anything solid going forward." However, in January 2017, Grazer again confirmed a fifth season plan, stating that all of the original series actors are on board for a new season, with an official deal expected to be made "within a couple of weeks".

Netflix confirmed on May 17, 2017, that a fifth season, featuring the full cast from the show, had been ordered and would be expected to be released on their service in 2018. Production began in August 2017, with 17 episodes planned for the fifth season. Filming wrapped in November 2017. Tambor had been the subject of sexual misconduct allegations in November 2017 which led to him being taken off Transparent; however, the allegations did not impact his inclusion in season 5, and the show's team has stood in support of Tambor since then. On May 7, 2018, it was announced that the fifth season would premiere on May 29, 2018, and the season's trailer was released. To promote the fifth season, two versions of the Bluth Real Estate stair car, featuring the hashtag #AD5 and the website voteBLUTH.com, were driven around New York City and Los Angeles.

Portia de Rossi, who has retired from acting, only appears in five episodes from the fifth season.

Cast

Main
 Jason Bateman as Michael Bluth
 Portia de Rossi as Lindsay Bluth Fünke
 Will Arnett as Gob Bluth
 Michael Cera as George-Michael Bluth
 Alia Shawkat as Maeby Fünke
 Tony Hale as Buster Bluth
 David Cross as Tobias Fünke
 Jeffrey Tambor as George Bluth, Sr./Oscar Bluth
 Jessica Walter as Lucille Bluth

Recurring
 Ron Howard as Narrator/himself
Justin Grant Wade as Steve Holt
Ben Stiller as Tony Wonder
Christine Taylor as Sally Sitwell
Isla Fisher as Rebel Alley
Maria Bamford as DeBrie Bardeaux
Martin Mull as Gene Parmesan
Judy Greer as Kitty Sanchez
Henry Winkler as Barry Zuckerkorn
Ed Begley Jr. as Stan Sitwell
James Lipton as Warden Gentles
John Beard as John Beard
Rebecca Drysdale as Lieutenant Toddler
Kyle Mooney as Murphy-Brown
Lauren Weedman as Joni Beard

Guest stars
Frances Conroy as Lottie Dottie
Dermot Mulroney as Dusty
Gilbert Gottfried as infomercial narrator
Cheryl Howard as herself
Bryce Dallas Howard as herself
Paige Howard as herself
Rance Howard as himself
Alan Tudyk as Pastor Veal
Taran Killam as himself playing a young George Sr.
Cobie Smulders as herself playing a young Lucille
Jean Smart as herself playing Mimi
Steele Stebbins as himself playing a young Michael
Thomas Barbusca as himself playing a young Gob
Owen Vaccaro as himself playing a young Buster

Episodes

Reception
Many critics said the season was more in line with the original Fox episodes and that having the ensemble back together after previously separating them benefited the season. On Rotten Tomatoes, it holds an approval rating of 56% with an average score of 5.14/10, based on 52 reviews. The site's critical consensus reads, "Arrested Development finds itself back in familiar form, recapturing much of the cast's chemistry and comedic brilliance — though it still doesn't quite live up to its own past." On Metacritic, the season has a weighted average score of 67 out of 100, based on 20 critics, indicating "generally favorable reviews". 

Ben Travers of IndieWire gave it a positive review with a "B" grade, calling it a big improvement over season four. He wrote, "With the cast reunited and a better understanding of what made the characters lovable lunkheads to begin with, the new season can be effortlessly enjoyable; a pleasure to watch instead of something you have to dig through to find the parts you love." Sonya Saraiya of Vanity Fair praised it for returning to "the show you remember," claiming it to be far superior to the fourth season. She singles out Arnett's performance in particular, praising him as "magnificent." Caroline Framke of Variety also praised the new season for acknowledging and correcting some of the mistakes of the fourth season instead of ignoring them, while also highlighting the ability of the show to engage in character development after 15 years with regards to Cera and Shawkat's characters. She too praised Arnett as the standout of the cast. Tim Goodman of The Hollywood Reporter argued that the second Netflix season was "much, much better," than the first, believing that once the show "hits its stride, it evokes its glory days," overall being a "welcome return to form".

References

External links
 
 

 
2018 American television seasons
2019 American television seasons
Television series set in 2015
Split television seasons